The Valley of Silent Men is a 1922 American silent drama film directed by Frank Borzage and written by John Lynch based upon the novel of the same name by James Oliver Curwood. The film stars Alma Rubens, Lew Cody, Joe King, Mario Majeroni, George Nash, and J. W. Johnston. The film was released on September 10, 1922, by Paramount Pictures. It is not known whether the film currently survives in its entirety.

Cast 
Alma Rubens as Marette Radison
Lew Cody as Cpl. James Kent
Joe King as 'Buck' O'Connor
Mario Majeroni as Pierre Radison
George Nash as Inspector Kedsty
J. W. Johnston as Jacques Radison

Preservation status
An incomplete print is held by the Library of Congress which indicates two reels are missing.

References

External links 

 
 
James Oliver Curwood, The Valley of Silent Men; A Story of the Three River Country, New York: Cosmopolitan Book Co. 1920

1922 films
1920s English-language films
Silent American drama films
1922 drama films
Paramount Pictures films
Films directed by Frank Borzage
American black-and-white films
American silent feature films
Northern (genre) films
Royal Canadian Mounted Police in fiction
Films based on novels by James Oliver Curwood
1920s American films